Jacco Eltingh defeated MaliVai Washington 6–3, 6–4 in the final to secure the title.

Seeds

Draw

Finals

Section 1

Section 2

External links
 1992 Manchester Open Singles draw

Singles